Collins Bay Airport  is located on the west side of Wollaston Lake, on Collins Bay, near Collins Creek, Saskatchewan, Canada.

See also
List of airports in Saskatchewan

References

External links
Collins Bay Airport on COPA's Places to Fly airport directory

Registered aerodromes in Saskatchewan